The National Contract Management Association (NCMA) is a professional association, based in the United States, dedicated to the profession of contract management.  Founded in 1959, NCMA now has over 20,000 members and more than 100 local chapters.  NCMA promotes contract management through various means, including education, networking, publications, legislative and regulatory alerts, professional certifications, a code of ethics, awards, job postings, salary surveys, and a leadership development program.

Certification programs
NCMA offers the following professional certifications in contract management:
Certified Professional Contracts Manager (CPCM) based on demonstrating certain education, training, and experience requirements and successfully passing a comprehensive exam on a broad  body of knowledge (BOK) for contract management.
Certified Federal Contracts Manager (CFCM), previously Certified Associate Contracts Manager (CACM), based on demonstrating certain education, training, and experience requirements and successfully passing a comprehensive exam on the Federal Acquisition Regulation (FAR).
Certified Commercial Contracts Manager (CCCM) based on demonstrating certain education, training, and experience requirements and successfully passing a comprehensive exam on the Uniform Commercial Code (UCC).

Publications
NCMA produces the following contract management publications:
 Contract Management
 Journal of Contract Management
 Contract Management News
 Annual Review of Government Contracting
 Annual Contract Management Salary Survey
 Contract Management Standard (CMS) (ANSI/NCMA ASD 1) 
 Contract Management Body of Knowledge (CMBOK)
 Desktop Guide to Basic Contracting Terms

See also
Contract
Contract management
Government procurement in the United States
Federal Acquisition Regulation (FAR)
Acquisition Management System (AMS)
Uniform Commercial Code (UCC)
United States contract law
National Grants Management Association (NGMA)

References

External links
 

Government procurement in the United States
Business and finance professional associations
Professional associations based in the United States
Professional titles and certifications
Organizations established in 1959
Standards organizations in the United States